David Bouley (born May 27, 1953, near Storrs, Connecticut) is an American chef with dual French citizenship. Sole owner and chef with restaurants in Tribeca, New York City. He is best known for his flagship restaurant, Bouley, synonymous with high standards, Nouveau Cuisine redefined in the guise of a lighter French paradigm for the highest density of food nutrition and community. 

Early in his career, Bouley worked in restaurants in Cape Cod, Santa Fe, New Mexico, and, eventually, France and Switzerland. While in Europe, after studies at the Sorbonne, he had the opportunity to work with chefs Roger Vergé, Paul Bocuse, Joël Robuchon, Gaston Lenôtre, Frédy Girardet, and Paul Haeberlin. Bouley returned to work in New York City in leading restaurants of the time, such as Le Cirque, Le Périgord, and La Côte Basque, as well as spending time as sous chef in a restaurant opened by Roger Vergé in San Francisco. In 1985, he became chef of Montrachet restaurant, awarded three stars in its first three weeks by the New York Times. In 1987 he became Chef/Owner of his namesake restaurant, "Bouley," in TriBeCa overlooking Duane Park. The restaurant earned a four-star review in The New York Times and won over six James Beard Foundation awards which included Best Restaurant and Best Chef. In 2015, Bouley was awarded the "Best Restaurant Award in the United States" from TripAdvisor's Traveler's Choice Awards, ranking #14 in the world. Bouley also received a 29 out of 30 rating in Zagat for decades finishing with a 4.9 out of five in 2020.

In 1991, Zagat's asked its 7,000 diners, "Where you would you eat the last meal of your life?" Respondents "overwhelmingly" chose Bouley. In 1997, Bouley restaurant moved location and opened up as the Bouley Bakery. In September 1999, Bouley opened Danube, a Viennese-inspired restaurant, located on Hudson Street, and authored his first book East of Paris: The New Cuisines of Austria and the Danube.

Following the September 11 attacks, Bouley Bakery served as a base to feed rescue and relief workers at Ground Zero. Known as The Green Tarp, over one million meals for Ground Zero relief workers were prepared in conjunction with the Red Cross. Bouley Bakery re-opened to the general public in 2002.

In 1999, Bouley Bakery earned four stars by The New York Times and two Michelin Stars before it changed locations in 2008 and was renamed Bouley Restaurant. His other restaurant, Danube, also received two Michelin stars. The Danube location was transformed into a new entity called Brushstroke Restaurant in 2011.

Brushstroke Restaurant, located in TriBeCa, was a combined effort between Chef Bouley and the Tsuji Culinary Institute in Osaka, to share Japanese food culture and products while integrating American ingredients. It received two Michelin stars, becoming a leader in Kaiseki cuisine. 

Bouley Botanical, on another corner in TriBeCa, was an event space dedicated to cultivating nutrient-rich plants, served in the flagship Bouley Restaurant. It also served as an educational forum to develop creative healthy eating lifestyles through its lecture series: The Chef & The Doctor. Its inception in 2013 continues today on multiple platforms.

Bouley Test Kitchen from 2005 to 2020 was a private event space and learning center for visiting guest chefs and for developing recipes for the Bouley enterprises. The facilities were used by the American Team for the Bocuse d'Or Competition 2011. In 2018 the Test Kitchen moved to the Flatiron District with a new entity Bouley at Home. Guests were seated at three long white counters created in conjunction with Bulthaup Kitchen design to showcase the methodology, building blocks, and techniques that define Bouley cuisine. 

In March of 2020 due to the COVID-19 pandemic, Bouley Test Kitchen closed and Bouley at Home moved back to TriBeCa serving as an R&D studio for his upcoming book Bouley at Home: Living Pantry.

Dedicated to sharing pure and specialized limited cultivated products with his clientele, Bouley is one of the first chefs in America to create Tasting Menus. Since the 1980s his personalization of each customer’s likes and desires of specific ingredients is health-driven. It’s said that Bouley may not remember a customer’s name but knows exactly what they ate from a 12-course meal several years later. He is sought out by those with auto-immune challenges. This approach has won him Lifetime Achievement Awards from the Celiac Disease Center at Columbia University and the Rogosin Institute, an affiliate of New York-Presbyterian. 

In 2015 Bouley was the first non-Japanese citizen garnered the Japanese Cuisine (Washoku) Goodwill Ambassador, by the Japanese Government. Washoku means "harmony of food" and is associated with an essential spirit of respect for nature that is closely related to the sustainable use of natural resources. NHK’s 2019 documentary traces Bouley’s exploration of longevity through artisanal products and their growers, including doctors, biochemists, and nutritionists. Throughout 35 prefectures, A Magic of a Dish demonstrates and quantifies health benefits with a focus on fermented foods. Episodes continue to be added into 2022.

Since the inception of his first restaurant, Bouley is dedicated to the use of pure ingredients and techniques to create “unbreakable health”. He is a pioneer in using organic, wild-caught, grass-fed, and finished or foraged products. Working with farmers to grow nutrient-dense herbs and vegetables, like the fingerling potatoes, as early as the 1980’s to the present. Chef Bouley was invited as a commencement speaker for the College of Agriculture, Health and Natural Resources at the University of Connecticut and an honorary degree recipient of Doctors and Humane Letters.

In 2020, mid pandemic, the French Government bestowed upon Bouley the honor of the title of Knight in the Order of the agricultural Merit (Ordre du Mérite de l’Agriculture et de l’Alimentation). One of five categories of The Legion of Honor, it is the highest decoration in France: an order of merit bestowed for outstanding contributions to food and agriculture. Bouley accredits Mother Nature for allowing synergies to share her gifts of joy, altering one’s health to change lives.

Restaurants
Bouley Bakery earned two Michelin Stars before it changed locations in 2008 and was renamed Bouley Restaurant. His other restaurant, Danube, also initially received two Michelin stars. The Danube location was transformed into a new entity called Brushstroke Restaurant.

Brushstroke Restaurant, located at 30 Hudson Street and opened in April 2011, was a combined effort between Bouley and the Tsuji Culinary Institute in Osaka, to share Japanese food culture and products while integrating American ingredients.

Bouley Test Kitchen is a private event and testing learning center for visiting guest chefs and for developing recipes for the Bouley enterprises. The facilities were used by the American Team for the Bocuse d'Or Competition 2011. It was relocated from TriBeCa, lower Manhattan, to the Flat Iron District in October 2017.

Bouley Botanical, on another corner in TriBeCa, located at 281 Church Street, is an event space dedicated to cultivating nutrient-rich plants, served in the flagship Bouley Restaurant. It also serves as an educational forum to develop creative healthy eating lifestyles through its lecture series: The Chef & The Doctor.

Bouley at Home, a fine dining restaurant, is Bouley's first venture in Manhattan crossing Canal Street. Located at 31 West 21st Street in the Flat Iron District, Bouley at Home is a collaboration with Bulthaup Kitchen Design group based in Germany, with divisions across the United States and Europe.

Awards
Bouley was presented with the Gohan Society's Washoku Ambassador Award. Washoku means "harmony of food" in Japanese, and it is associated with an essential spirit of respect for nature that is closely related to the sustainable use of natural resources.

Officier de Bouche from Confrerie Gastronomique de la Marmitr d'OR 2007

Lifetime Achievement Awards from the Celiac Disease Center at Columbia University

Honorary Ph.D. From the University of Connecticut

Knight in the Order of the agricultural Merit 2020

James Beard: Outstanding Restaurant 1991, Who's Who of Food & Beverage in America 1991, Best Chef in America Award 1994, Outstanding Chef 2000

Books
 East of Paris: The New Cuisines of Austria and the Danube (Ecco) Authors:  David Bouley, Mario Lohninger, Melissa Clark (2003).

References

American male chefs
American chefs
American restaurateurs
Living people
1953 births
Head chefs of Michelin starred restaurants
Businesspeople from New York City
People from Storrs, Connecticut
James Beard Foundation Award winners